Philosophical Problems of Space and Time (1963; second edition 1973) is a book about the philosophy of space and time by the philosopher Adolf Grünbaum. It is recognized as a major work in the philosophy of the natural sciences.

Summary

Grünbaum, who acknowledges his debts to the philosopher Hans Reichenbach, discusses the philosophy of space and time, and scientific and mathematical fields such as geometry, chronometry, and geochronometry. He also provides an account of the Philosophiæ Naturalis Principia Mathematica (1687) of the physicist Isaac Newton, as well as the work of other physicists such as Albert Einstein, and that of the mathematician Bernhard Riemann. He criticizes the philosophers Ernest Nagel and Jacques Maritain, arguing that in The Structure of Science (1961) Nagel misinterprets the philosopher of science Henri Poincaré and that in The Degrees of Knowledge (1932) Maritain misinterprets the nature of geometry.

Publication history
Philosophical Problems of Space and Time was first published by Alfred A. Knopf in the United States in 1963. In 1964, the book was published by Routledge and Kegan Paul in the United Kingdom. In 1969, a revised version was published in Russian translation in the Soviet Union by Progress Publishers. In 1973, an enlarged section was published in English by D. Reidel Publishing Company, as part of the series Boston Studies in the Philosophy of Science.

Reception
The philosophers Robert S. Cohen and Marx W. Wartofsky stated that Philosophical Problems of Space and Time was "promptly recognized to be one of the few major works in the philosophy of the natural sciences of this generation" upon its original publication. They believed that this was partly because Grünbaum showed devotion to both "actual science and philosophical understanding" and combined "detail with scope." They credited him with dealing with the "problems of space and time" in their "full depth and complexity".

The philosopher Milič Čapek wrote that Grünbaum was, alongside the physicist Olivier Costa de Beauregard, one of the "most vigorous defenders" of the view that time should be treated as equivalent to space. The philosopher Roger Scruton described Philosophical Problems of Space and Time as the most comprehensive discussion of non-Euclidean space, though he added that the work was "far from inviting". The philosopher Philip L. Quinn called Grünbaum's thesis about physical geometry and chronometry "striking".

References

Bibliography
Books

 
 
 
 
 

1963 non-fiction books
Alfred A. Knopf books
American non-fiction books
Books by Adolf Grünbaum
Contemporary philosophical literature
English-language books
Metaphysics books
Philosophy of science literature
Works about philosophy of physics